Liulihe Area is a town and an area within Fangshan District, Beijing. It borders Shilou, Doudian and Changyang Towns in its north, Beizangcun and Pangezhuang Towns in its east, Zhuolu City in its south, and Hangcunhe Town in its west. In the year 2020, its total population was 66,787.

The name Liulihe comes from the Liuli River that passes through the town.

History

Administrative divisions

In 2021, Liulihe Area oversaw 52 subdivisions, which can be further classified into 5 communities and 47 villages:

Landmark 
 Western Zhou Yan State Capital Museum

See also
List of township-level divisions of Beijing

References

External links
Official Government website (in Chinese)

Fangshan District
Areas of Beijing
Towns in Beijing